Inka P'iqi (Aymara p'iqi, p'iq'iña, phiq'i, phiq'iña head, Inka Inca, "Inca head", also spelled Inca Pekhe) is a  mountain in the Bolivian Andes. It is located in the Cochabamba Department, on the border of the Arani Province, Vacas Municipality, and the Mizque Province, Alalay Municipality. Inka P'iqi lies southwest of Jatun Llallawa and south of Juch'uy Llallawa.

References 

Mountains of Cochabamba Department